Alain Marguerettaz (born 31 August 1962) is a French Paralympian who started in alpine skiing. His first Paralympics was in 1992 and he received a bronze medal in giant slalom LWXII at the 1994 Paralympics. He would later switch to Nordic events and received a bronze in the 2006 Winter Paralympics for cross-country skiing in the 5 km sitting event. He will represent France again in cross-country skiing at the 2010 Winter Paralympics in Vancouver.

References

External links 
 

1962 births
Living people
French male alpine skiers
French male cross-country skiers
Alpine skiers at the 1992 Winter Paralympics
Alpine skiers at the 1994 Winter Paralympics
Cross-country skiers at the 2002 Winter Paralympics
Cross-country skiers at the 2006 Winter Paralympics
Paralympic bronze medalists for France
Medalists at the 2006 Winter Paralympics
Medalists at the 1994 Winter Paralympics
Paralympic medalists in alpine skiing
Paralympic alpine skiers of France
20th-century French people
21st-century French people